Thumatha fuscescens is a moth of the family Erebidae first described by Francis Walker in 1866. It is found in Australia, South-East Asia, India, Sri Lanka, the Comoros, Réunion, Madagascar, and Gabon.

Description
The male has a pale reddish-brownish body. Forewings possess traces of antemedial and postmedial waved lines. There is a black spot at end of the cell and a spot on the costa before apex. Sub-marginal and marginal specks series present.

The larva is known to feed on lichens and mosses.

Subspecies 
 Thumatha fuscescens fuscescens (south-east Asia, Australia)
 Thumatha fuscescens africana Kühne, 2007 (Africa)

References

External links
 "Thumatha fuscescens". Lepidoptera Barcode of Life. With images.
 Musée d'Histoire Naturnel Nationale de Paris: Live picture of T. fuscescens

Nudariina
Moths described in 1866
Moths of Africa
Moths of Asia
Moths of Australia
Moths of the Comoros
Moths of Madagascar
Taxa named by Francis Walker (entomologist)